Vazharov Peak is the ice-covered peak rising to 780 m in Brugmann Mountains on Liège Island in the Palmer Archipelago, Antarctica.  It surmounts Shterna Glacier to the north, Coria Cove to the east-southeast and Sigmen Glacier to the west-southwest.

The feature is named after Mihail Vazharov, mechanic at St. Kliment Ohridski base in 1999/2000 and subsequent seasons, and base commander during part of the 2005/06 season.

Location
British mapping in 1978.

Maps
 British Antarctic Territory.  Scale 1:200000 topographic map.  DOS 610 Series, Sheet W 64 60.  Directorate of Overseas Surveys, UK, 1978.
 Antarctic Digital Database (ADD). Scale 1:250000 topographic map of Antarctica. Scientific Committee on Antarctic Research (SCAR). Since 1993, regularly upgraded and updated.

Notes

References
 Bulgarian Antarctic Gazetteer. Antarctic Place-names Commission. (details in Bulgarian, basic data in English)
 Vazharov Peak. SCAR Composite Antarctic Gazetteer.

External links
 Vazharov Peak. Copernix satellite image

Mountains of the Palmer Archipelago
Bulgaria and the Antarctic
Liège Island